Vila Real Airport  is an airport located  southeast of Vila Real, Portugal.

Airlines and destinations
The following airlines operate regular scheduled and charter flights at Vila Real Airport:

See also
Transport in Portugal
List of airports in Portugal

References

Airports in Portugal
Buildings and structures in Vila Real District
Buildings and structures in Vila Real